The 1910–11 international cricket season was from September 1910 to April 1911.

Season overview

December

South Africa in Australia

March

MCC in the West Indies

References

International cricket competitions by season
1910 in cricket
1911 in cricket